Sir James Sharp Tait  (13 June 1912 – 18 February 1998) was a Scottish electrical engineer who was the first Vice-Chancellor of the City University, London.

Life
Tait was born on 13 June 1912 in Ochiltree, Ayrshire, the son of a gardener. He left school at 14 to become an engineering apprentice and taking evening classes. He obtained an engineering qualification ARTC (with a distinction in electrical engineering) at the Royal Technical College, Glasgow, and stayed on as a lecturer.  While working as a lecturer, he gained a double first class honours degree in Electrical and Mechanical Engineering, as an external student of London University and went on to get a PhD from Glasgow University.

He married Mary Cassidy Linton (who survived him) in 1939. They had two sons and one daughter.

In 1946 he was appointed Head of the Electrical Engineering Department at Portsmouth Municipal College, but in 1947 took up the equivalent position at Northampton Polytechnic.  In 1951, he became its Principal.  In 1957 it became a College of Advanced Technology with Tait as its Principal, and in 1966 became the City University, London, at which point Tait became its first Vice-Chancellor. He retired in 1974.
 
Outside work, he was an Elder of the Presbyterian Church and was active in the Scouting movement.

He died on 18 February 1998, in Teddington in the London Borough of Richmond upon Thames.

Honours
Tait was knighted in 1969 as a member of the Imperial Society of Knights Bachelor for services to education, and made Freeman of the City of London.  He was a Chartered Engineer, and a Fellow of both the Institution of Electrical Engineers and the Institution of Mechanical Engineers. City University, London, awarded him an honorary Doctor of Science degree in 1974 and also named a building after him. He was awarded a Doctor of Laws by Strathclyde University, the successor to the Royal Technical College, Glasgow.

References

1912 births
1998 deaths
20th-century Presbyterians
Fellows of the Institution of Mechanical Engineers
Knights Bachelor
People from East Ayrshire
Presidents of City, University of London
Scottish electrical engineers
Scottish Presbyterians